Georgios Koutsioumpas (born May 18, 1981 in Trikala) is an amateur Greek Greco-Roman wrestler, who competed in the men's heavyweight category. Koutsioumpas represented his home nation Greece at the 2004 Summer Olympics in Athens, and later picked up a silver medal in the 96-kg division at the 2005 Mediterranean Games in Almería, Spain. Throughout his sporting career, Koutsioumpas, along with his older brother Xenofon, trained as a member of the Greco-Roman wrestling team for Olympiacos F.C. in Piraeus, and since 2012 they have been training at Atlas Mytilenes under their head coach Sotirios Petrakis.

Koutsioumpas qualified as a member of the Greek squad in the men's 96 kg class at the 2004 Summer Olympics in Athens by receiving an allocated place and an automatic spot for the host nation from the International Federation of Associated Wrestling. By the delight of the boisterous home crowd inside the Ano Liossa Olympic Hall, Koutsioumpas opened his match by edging Kazakhstan's Asset Mambetov out of the mat with an effortless throw, but suffered a tedious 6–11 blowout from Egypt's Karam Gaber on his second bout. Despite a single loss, Koutsioumpas continued to grapple powerfully against Poland's Marek Sitnik and paid off by a 3–2 sudden death decision. Finishing third in the prelim pool, Koutsioumpas' performance fell short to put him through into the quarterfinals, as he left his home crowd in agony. When Iran's Masoud Hashemzadeh was disqualified for an illegal protest during the bronze medal match, Koutsioumpas' position was eventually upgraded to seventh.

References

External links

Profile – International Wrestling Database

1981 births
Living people
Olympic wrestlers of Greece
Wrestlers at the 2004 Summer Olympics
Olympiacos Wrestlers
Sportspeople from Trikala
Greek male sport wrestlers
Mediterranean Games silver medalists for Greece
Competitors at the 2005 Mediterranean Games
Mediterranean Games medalists in wrestling
21st-century Greek people